Elliot Walker (born September 10, 1956) is a former American football running back in the National Football League (NFL) who played for the San Francisco 49ers. He played college football for the Pittsburgh Panthers. He also played in the Canadian Football League (CFL) for the Toronto Argonauts.

References

1956 births
Living people
American football running backs
Canadian football running backs
San Francisco 49ers players
Toronto Argonauts players
Pittsburgh Panthers football players